El Mundo may refer to:

Newspapers
El Mundo (Argentina), an Argentine newspaper
El Mundo (Bolivia), a Bolivian newspaper
El Mundo (California), a California newspaper based in San Francisco
El Mundo (Colombia), a Colombian newspaper based in Medellín 
El Mundo (Cuba), a Cuban newspaper which has ceased publication 
El Mundo (El Salvador), a Salvadoran newspaper
El Mundo (Nevada), a Nevada newspaper
El Mundo (Puerto Rico), a Puerto Rican newspaper
El Mundo (Santa Cruz), a Bolivian newspaper
El Mundo (Spain), a Spanish newspaper
El Mundo (Texas), a Texas newspaper
El Mundo (Venezuela), a Venezuelan newspaper

Other uses
El Mundo (Diomedes Díaz album), a 1983 album recorded by Diomedes Díaz
El Mundo (Mitsou album), a 1988 album recorded by Mitsou
El Mundo (game), a four-player tables game described in the Alfonso X manuscript Libro de los juegos

See also
Mundo (disambiguation)